The 2008–09 National League A season, was the second ice hockey season of the National League A since the reorganization of the Swiss league and the 71st in the history of Swiss professional hockey.

Regular season

Playoffs

Relegation

EHC Biel would later defeat Lausanne HC, Champions of the National League B, 4-3 to remain in the National League A

External links
 

1
Swiss